Klickitat is an unincorporated community and census-designated place (CDP) in Klickitat County, Washington, United States. The population was 362 at the 2010 census. Once the site of a lumber mill, it is now primarily a bedroom community.

Geography 
Klickitat is located along the Klickitat River at  (45.816412, -121.163790). The closest major town is Goldendale,  to the east. State Route 142 passes through Klickitat, leading southwest (downstream)  to Pitt and east (upstream) the same distance to Wahkiacus.

Demographics 
As of the census of 2000, there were 417 people, 147 households, and 110 families residing in the CDP. The population density was 161.9 people per square mile (62.4/km2). There were 173 housing units at an average density of 67.2/sq mi (25.9/km2). The racial makeup of the CDP was 92.33% White, 0.24% African American, 3.60% Native American, 0.96% Asian, and 2.88% from two or more races. Hispanic or Latino of any race were 2.64% of the population.

There were 147 households, out of which 43.5% had children under the age of 18 living with them, 58.5% were married couples living together, 10.2% had a female householder with no husband present, and 24.5% were non-families. 21.1% of all households were made up of individuals, and 5.4% had someone living alone who was 65 years of age or older. The average household size was 2.84 and the average family size was 3.28.

In the CDP, the population was spread out, with 35.5% under the age of 18, 7.7% from 18 to 24, 26.4% from 25 to 44, 20.6% from 45 to 64, and 9.8% who were 65 years of age or older. The median age was 30 years. For every 100 females, there were 84.5 males. For every 100 females age 18 and over, there were 94.9 males.

The median income for a household in the CDP was $28,750, and the median income for a family was $29,688. Males had a median income of $30,500 versus $16,250 for females. The per capita income for the CDP was $11,717. About 27.8% of families and 29.7% of the population were below the poverty line, including 32.5% of those under age 18 and 11.5% of those age 65 or over.

History 
The site where the town is located was originally called "Wrights" after one of the original settlers. This was the name given to the rail stop there. The rail stop down the river at milepost 7.2 was named "Klickitat", after the Klickitat people and the railroad later switched the two signs when the carbonated beverage company Klickitat Pop (operating near the town) gained fame. On February 7, 1910, the name of the town post office was officially changed to "Klickitat".

The first non-native settlers arrived in 1890 seeking land to homestead. The abundance of timber drew in other settlers during the early 1900s. Travel through the Klickitat canyon and up to the plateau was arduous until the completion of a rail line in 1903.[4, p. 47] The rail line eased travel and facilitated the transportation of people, crops, livestock and timber. The lumber mill was the primary employer in town, with the first major mill formed 1909, until 1994 when the mill was permanently closed. The naturally carbonated Klickitat Mineral Springs just east of town gave rise to health spas, a carbonated beverage company, and a large dry ice plant which operated until 1957.

Recreation 

The area surrounding the town of Klickitat and the river which shares its name are renowned for their seasonal hunting and fishing. During summer, popular activities on the Klickitat River include recreational drift boating, kayaking, and rafting. Paths and trails provide opportunities for scenic hikes. The  Klickitat Trail is on the route of the former railroad tracks, now a biking and hiking trail. The trail follows the Klickitat River north from the Columbia River past the town of Klickitat. Washington State Route 142 provides a scenic drive through the canyon. Two miles east of town is the ruins of the dry ice plant with a single remaining building. The site is now a public campsite.

References

Further reading 
 Niels, Selma M., So This Is Klickitat. Metropolitan Press, 1967.

External links
 Klickitat School District
 Klickitat community website
 Klickitat Historical Museum
 About the Klickitat Trail

Census-designated places in Klickitat County, Washington
Census-designated places in Washington (state)